The President of the Central Committee of the League of Communists of Montenegro was the head of the League of Communists of Montenegro, heading the Central Committee of the Party.

History
The holder of the office was, for a significant period, the de facto most influential politician in the Socialist Republic of Montenegro, a constituent republic of Yugoslavia. The official name of the office was changed in July 1982 from "Secretary of the Central Committee" to President of the Presidency of the Central Committee of the League of Communists of Montenegro (Predsednik Predsedništva Centralnog komiteta Saveza komunista Crne Gore).

The League of Communists of Montenegro was also an organization subordinate to the federal-level League of Communists of Yugoslavia. Between May 1943 and September 1952, the former was named the Communist Party of Montenegro (being part of the larger Communist Party of Yugoslavia), until both parties were renamed "League of Communists" in 1952.

List

See also
League of Communists of Montenegro
Socialist Republic of Montenegro
List of presidents of Montenegro
Prime Minister of Montenegro
President of the Parliament of Montenegro

References

Communism in Montenegro
League of Communists of Montenegro politicians